Shuttered Room is the debut studio album by British new wave band the Fixx, released on 14 May 1982.

It contains the group's debut single, "Stand or Fall", which hit the Top 10 of Billboard's Album Rock Tracks as well as #79 on the Hot 100.  Its follow-up single was "Red Skies".  Both songs were aided by popular MTV music videos.

Track listing
Shuttered Room has been released in a number of different configurations. Though the front cover artwork remains consistent across the releases, the tracks, track order, and even the credits can vary from release to release.

Original UK track listing (MCA Records FX 1001)
The UK version differs from the US (and later CD) release in a number of respects, including the fact that all the songs are credited to Curnin/West-Oram/Woods/Greenall/Barrett, with lyrics attributed to Cy Curnin only, and that the engineer is listed as Stephen W Tayler rather than Taylor.

Side 1
"Some People" – 3:01
"Stand or Fall" – 4:00
"Cameras in Paris" – 3:52
"Shuttered Room" – 2:47
"The Fool" – 5:21

Side 2
"Lost Planes" – 3:23
"I Live" – 4:53
"Sinking Island" – 3:16
"Time In A Glass" – 3:32
"Red Skies" – 4:20

US track listing
On the US LP version, "Sinking Island" and " Time In A Glass" are dropped; "I Found You" and "The Strain" are added; and the track order is resequenced. All songs are credited as being written by Charlie Barrett, Cy Curnin, Rupert Greenall, and Jamie West-Oram, except where noted.

Side 1
"I Found You" – 3:38
"Some People" – 3:00
"Stand or Fall" – 4:00
"The Strain" (Barrett, Curnin, Greenall, West-Oram, Adam Woods) – 3:33
"Red Skies" – 4:19

Side 2
"Lost Planes" – 3:20
"Cameras in Paris" – 3:57
"I Live" (Barrett, Curnin, Greenall, West-Oram, Woods) – 4:52
"Shuttered Room" (Barrett, Curnin, Greenall, West-Oram, Woods) – 2:46
"The Fool" – 5:20

The CD version adds two tracks, (including "Sinking Island", although this is the 'Special Extended Dance Mix' originally released as the B-side on the "Red Skies" 12" single):
"Sinking Island" [*] (Barrett, Curnin, Greenall, West-Oram, Woods) – 4:33
"Stand or Fall" (Extended Mix) [*] (Barrett, Curnin, Greenall, West-Oram, Woods) – 4:48

1996 European CD reissue (Repertoire REP 4598-WY)
The 1996 European CD compiles all the tracks from the various issues onto one CD.

"Sinking Island" – 4:32
"I Found You" – 3:38
"Some People" – 3:00
"Stand or Fall" – 4:00
"Red Skies" – 4:20
"Lost Planes" – 3:20
"Cameras in Paris" – 3:57
"I Live" – 4:53
"Shuttered Room" – 2:46
"The Fool" – 5:21
"Time in a Glass" – 3:27
"The Strain" – 3:33
"Stand or Fall" (Extended Mix) – 4:52

Personnel
Cy Curnin – vocals
Adam Woods – percussion, drums
Rupert Greenall – keyboards
Jamie West-Oram – guitar
Charlie Barrett – bass

Production
Producer: Rupert Hine
Engineer: Stephen W Tayler
Remastering: David Bard
Sequencing: David Bard
Design: Chris Parker
Photography: Chris Parker
Repackaging: Ken Davis

Charts

Singles – Billboard (United States)

References

The Fixx albums
1982 debut albums
Albums produced by Rupert Hine
MCA Records albums